Eggslut (stylized as eggslut) is a sandwich restaurant chain with locations in Los Angeles, Las Vegas, Tokyo, Seoul, Kuwait, London and Singapore, known for its signature dish "The Slut", a coddled egg on pureed potatoes, as well as their egg sandwiches. It was founded by Alvin Cailan.

History
Eggslut's name refers to a chef who adds an egg to everything to make it better.  The first public use of it was by chef Anthony Bourdain in season 5, episode 5, of his show No Reservations, which aired on February 2, 2009.

In March 2017, Eggslut temporarily opened a pop-up concept store at Chefs Club Counter restaurant in Nolita, New York. Eggslut opened its first international store in the UK (7 August 2019), its second in Tokyo, Japan (13 September 2019), and its third international location in Seoul, South Korea (10 July 2020). Both locations are franchise owned. SPC Group, a Korean franchisor of Paris Baguette, and master franchisee of Dunkin Donuts, Baskin Robbins, Jamba Juice, and Shake Shack in Korea, has the rights to Eggslut in several countries. The brand also opened its first store in Singapore on 9 September 2021 at Scotts Square.

Reception
The restaurant's name has been included in a list of risqué names by KCET and The New York Times, with Eli Altman stating that having a boring name may mean that an advertisement doesn't attract attention. Samuel Muston wrote that "Eggslut" falls into a category of "quirky" restaurant names, but that "the collision of the word 'egg' and 'slut' doesn't exactly encourage the appetite".

The Grand Central Market in Los Angeles was named as one of the top ten new U.S. restaurants by Bon Appétit for 2014, and Eggslut is mentioned.

References

External links 

 

Restaurants in the Las Vegas Valley
Restaurants in Los Angeles
Fast-food restaurants